Anupong Polasak (born 20 May 1973) is a Thai former footballer and coach. He has played for the national beach soccer team, appearing at the 2002 Beach Soccer World Championship and the 2005 FIFA Beach Soccer World Cup, and for the national futsal team at the 2004 FIFA Futsal World Championship.

References

External links
Thailand Beach Soccer Team
Thailand Squad On Fifa.com

1973 births
Living people
Anupong Polasak
Anupong Polasak